The National Association for College Admission Counseling (NACAC), founded in 1937, is an organization of more than 25,000 professionals from around the world dedicated to serving students transitioning from secondary to postsecondary education. It includes professional school counselors at the secondary and postsecondary level, college access counselors, admission and financial aid officers, and others.

A member-directed organization, NACAC is governed by its voting members; an Assembly of delegates elected by voting members in NACAC's state and regional affiliates and by an elected Board of Directors.

NACAC holds several annual professional development events, including a national conference, and runs the National College Fairs program and Performing and Visual Arts College Fairs program which directly connect high school students with a wide variety of postsecondary institutions.

College fairs
NACAC’s National College Fair program provides the opportunity for students to meet college and university admission representatives to discuss courses, admission requirements, financial aid, and student life. Each year, more than 675,000 high school students and parents attend National College Fairs and NACAC’s Performing & Visual Arts College Fairs. The fairs are held throughout the country in both the spring and fall and are free and open to the public.

Regional affiliates
There are 23 regional affiliates of NACAC and they operate in a similar fashion and on a smaller scale.

See also
 College admissions in the United States
 Higher education in the United States
 Overseas Association of College Admissions Counselors
 Transfer admissions in the United States

References

External links 
 

University and college admissions
Educational organizations based in the United States
Education-related professional associations
1937 establishments in the United States
Organizations established in 1937